The AE86 series of the Toyota Corolla Levin and Toyota Sprinter Trueno are small, front-engine/rear-wheel-drive models within the front-engine/front-wheel-drive fifth generation Corolla (E80) range—marketed by Toyota from 1983 to 1987 in coupé and liftback configurations.

Lending themselves to racing, the cars were light, affordable, easily modifiable and combined a five-speed manual transmission, optional limited slip differential, MacPherson strut front suspension, high revving (7800 rpm), twin-cam engine with oil cooler (e.g., in the US), near 50/50 front/rear weight balance, and importantly, a front-engine/rear-drive layout—at a time when this configuration was waning industry-wide.

Widely popular for Showroom Stock, Group A, and Group N, Rally and Club racing, the cars' inherent qualities also earned the AE86 an early and enduring international prominence in the motorsport discipline of drifting. The AE86 was featured centrally in the popular, long-running Japanese manga and anime series titled Initial D (1995–2013)—as the main character's drift and tofu delivery car. In 2015, Road & Track called the AE86 "a cult icon, inextricably interwoven with the earliest days of drifting."

The AE86 would go on to inspire the Toyota 86 (2012–present), a 2+2 sports car jointly developed by Toyota and Subaru, manufactured by Subaru—and marketed also as the Toyota GT86, Toyota FT86, Scion FR-S and Subaru BRZ.

In November 2021, Toyota temporarily restarted the production of a limited number of parts for the AE86, with dealers beginning to take orders for new steering knuckle arms and rear brake calipers. Rear axle half shafts have also been scheduled for new production. Toyota has also announced that this reboot is temporary, and parts will only be available as long as stocks last.

Name

The nameplate Trueno derives from the Spanish word for thunder, and Levin derives from the Middle English for lightning. In Japan, the Sprinter Trueno was exclusive to Toyota Japan dealerships called Toyota Auto Store, while the Corolla Levin was exclusive to Toyota Corolla Store.

The name AE86 derives from Toyota's internal code during the car's development, designating the 1600 cc RWD model from the fifth generation of the Corolla. In Toyota's code language, the "A" designates the car's engine (4A series), "E" designates Corolla, "8" designates fifth generation (E80 series) and "6" designates the variant within this generation.

The AE86 is also called the "", Japanese for "eight-six". Similarly the AE85 was commonly called "", meaning "eight-five". 
Bracketing a minor external facelift, models marketed between 1983 and 1985 are called "zenki" (前期, lit. early period), and those marketed from 1986 to 1987 are called "kouki" (後期, lit. latter period).

In 1986, Toyota marketed a limited edition model of the AE86 as the "Black Limited" model. It was advertised as a limited-production model with only 400 units, and was based on the Kouki Sprinter Trueno GT-APEX 3-door liftback.

Engine/technical
The AE86 was available with a naturally aspirated 4A-GE  inline-four engine, a DOHC four-valve-per-cylinder motor, in Japan and Europe, which was also used in the first-generation MR2 G Limited (AW11), Corona GT (AT141), Celica 1600GT-R (AA63) and Carina 1600GTR (AA63) (Japan only) with a compression ratio of 9.4:1. The 4A-GE engines used in the AE86 and AW11 were also equipped with Denso electronic port fuel injection and T-VIS variable intake geometry.

In North America, a modified 4A-GEC engine was used to comply with California emissions regulations.

The AE86 used ventilated disc brakes. The car was equipped with a MacPherson strut style independent suspension at the front and a four-link live axle with coil springs for the rear as well as stabilizer bars, front and rear, and an optional LSD. The AE86 came with a 5-speed manual gearbox, and later came with the option of an automatic.

Higher-spec American AE86 models known as the Sport GT-S featured the DOHC 4A-GEC engine, four-wheel disc brakes, had a T-series 6.7" differential, color-matched bumpers, front lower bumper surround with a much more sporty and pronounced lip, molded door panels, tachometer redline at 7500 rpm, leather-wrapped steering wheel, seats with leather-wrapped tops (front seats are completely different from Sport SR5), optional LSD, and aluminium wheels. The VIN of the GT-S is AE88 (for North American market cars), however the chassis code on the engine firewall remained as AE86. The Sport GT-S can also be identified by the "Q" identification on the 4th digit of the model code, found on the chassis plate.

Lower-spec American AE86 SR5 models used the  4A-C SOHC unit, The S-series rear end was a 6.38" non-LSD with drum brakes. The SR5 model also had a softer suspension, and small styling and interior changes such as seats, gauge cluster, door panels, un-painted matte black front and rear bumpers, the lower part of the front bumper surround is shorter and flat, and its VIN differs as well, being AE86 for the SR5 model (for North American market cars). The SR5 can also be identified by the "X" identification on the 4th digit of the model code, found on the chassis plate.

Another lower-spec American AE86 model was the base-model DX, which had the same  4A-C SOHC unit and 6.38" non-LSD rear end with drum brakes as the SR5. It had a smaller center console, no rear sway bars, no air-conditioning, a very basic interior, and many options present on the GT-S and SR5 that were unavailable in the DX. The DX was an internal Toyota designation and was absent in advertising and brochures, as well as being more uncommon than the SR5 and GT-S. The VIN of the DX is AE85 (which is not to be confused with the Japan-only AE85), but as with the GT-S, the chassis code on the engine firewall remained as AE86. The DX can also be identified with the "D" identification on the 4th digit of the model code, found on the chassis plate.

Models equipped with the 4A-GE engine received a  T-series rear differential, while 3A-U (only offered on the AE85), 4A-U and 4A-C models received a smaller, weaker,  S-series rear differential.

The AE86 DX and SR5 (4A-C equipped) had an optional 4-speed automatic transmission alongside the 5-speed manual, however the GT-S model (with the 4A-GE DOHC engine) only came with a standard 5-speed manual gearbox.

One of the staff who was behind the car's engineering work was Nobuaki Katayama, who would later head the company's motorsport department and who would become chief engineer of the Altezza project a decade later. He has a photo of an AE86 hung in his office.

Body styles

 
The Levin and Trueno featured fixed-headlights and retractable headlights respectively, with both available as hatchback or coupé. The export model name Corolla applies to both variations.
The AE86 (along with the lower spec  AE85 and  SR5 and DX versions) was rear wheel drive, built on the rear wheel drive E70 Corolla platform (same wheelbase length, interchangeable parts, etc.), unlike the front wheel drive E80 models in the same range.

Pre-facelift (Zenki)

Facelift (Kouki) 
Minor bodywork changes were made in May 1985, which resulted in different taillights, updated bumpers with wrap-around front indicators, corner and headlight trim lights, interior, and grilles. New paint colors have been shuffled around as well. Both the Levin and Trueno now have halogen lamps as standard. The seats on the GT-V and GT-APEX models have also been redesigned. They are the main differences for both AE85/86 Levin and Trueno coupé and liftback models.

Models/specifications
In Japan, the DOHC 4A-GEU AE86 was offered in GT, GT-V and GT-APEX trims as the Corolla Levin or Sprinter Trueno. In North America, the top-spec DOHC 4A-GEC was sold as the Corolla Sport GT-S (with AE86 on the build plate in the engine bay but AE88 in the VIN), with the SOHC 4A-C being sold as the Corolla Sport DX and SR5 (with AE85 on the VIN but AE86 on the build plate in the engine bay in the DX and AE86 on the build plate and in the VIN in the SR5). Both versions were sold with Trueno pop-up headlights and Levin taillights, and had longer, heavier 5 mph (8 km/h) regulated bumpers in the front and rear. Euro-spec models were sold as the Corolla GT, Corolla GT Coupe, and Corolla GT-i, with DOHC engines and fixed Levin-style headlights. Australian models were sold as the Toyota Sprinter, also with fixed Levin headlights but with Trueno taillights. New Zealand received a limited number of AE86s with DOHC 4A-GE engines, again with fixed Levin headlights. These AE86s were only offered in the 3-door liftback style. The Middle East received the same basic model as the North American market, with Trueno pop-up headlights, Levin taillights, and the regulated 5 mph (8 km/h) bumpers.

It has the same exterior as the GT-V trim, but with the interior of the AE85 with the exception of the gauges, and is equipped with rear drum brakes.

Japanese AE86 specifications 

There are three types of the Corolla Levin and Sprinter Trueno for the Japanese market: GT, GT-V, and GT-APEX.

Note that all AE86 models produced in Japan featured the 1.6 L 4A-GEU engine.

Model codes (Sprinter Trueno): 

 AE86-FCMQF: 4A-GEU, GT-V 5F/MT, 3-door liftback
 AE86-FCMVF: 4A-GEU, GT-APEX 5F/MT, 3-door liftback
 AE86-FCPVF: 4A-GEU, GT-APEX 4F/AT, 3-door liftback (Kouki only, Automatic, A44DE equipped)
 AE86-FSMQF: 4A-GEU, GT 5F/MT, 2-door coupe
 AE86-FSMVF: 4A-GEU, GT-APEX 5F/MT, 2-door coupe
 AE86-FSPQF: 4A-GEU, GT 4F/AT, 2-door coupe (Kouki only, Automatic, A44DE equipped)
 AE86-FSPVF: 4A-GEU, GT-APEX 4F/AT, 2-door coupe (Kouki only, Automatic, A44DE equipped)

Model codes (Corolla Levin): 

 AE86-ECMQF: 4A-GEU, GT-V 5F/MT, 3-door liftback
 AE86-ECMVF: 4A-GEU, GT-APEX 5F/MT, 3-door liftback
 AE86-ECPVF: 4A-GEU, GT-APEX 4F/AT, 3-door liftback (Kouki only, Automatic, A44DE equipped)
 AE86-ESMQF: 4A-GEU, GT 5F/MT, 2-door coupe
 AE86-ESMVF: 4A-GEU, GT-APEX 5F/MT, 2-door coupe
 AE86-ESPQF: 4A-GEU, GT 4F/AT, 2-door coupe (Kouki only, Automatic, A44DE equipped)
 AE86-ESPVF: 4A-GEU, GT-APEX 4F/AT, 2-door coupe (Kouki only, Automatic, A44DE equipped)

Japanese model variations

GT-APEX 
This trim level is the highest level of the AE86, featuring two-tone paint colors, tilting steering column, rear wiper on hatchback, rear defrost, brown-tinted glass (all other models (including export models) had blue-tinted glass), air-conditioning, power steering, the interior of the AE86 GT, power mirrors, three-spoke steering wheel, interior illumination dimming, and adjustable interval wipers. A special thermostatic flip-up grille was also available as an option on the Levin (Zenki models only). Options include (but not limited to): limited slip differential (LSD), cruise control, power windows, power sunroof, digital instrument cluster (GT-APEX only), automatic air-conditioning, OEM aero sports package (available after Sep 1983), optional alloy wheels, Alpine sound system, fog lights on the Levin (Kouki models only), automatic transmission (Kouki models only), mudflaps, and rear hatch visor and quarter window billboards. All of these options are available on both the Levin and Trueno, in both 2-door and 3-door body styles.

GT-V 
This trim level is the upmarket lightweight-sports grade level of the AE86, which features the interior of the AE86 GT, three-spoke steering wheel, smaller center console, illumination dimming,  steel wheels, blue-tinted glass, and side door decals denoting "GT-V Twin Cam 16". Options include (but not limited to): two-tone paint colors, air-conditioning, power steering, power mirrors, rear wipers, limited slip differential (LSD), optional alloy wheels, OEM aero sports package (available after Sep 1983), mudflaps, digital instrument cluster, and body-colored bumpers. All of these options are available on both the Levin and Trueno, however the GT-V trim was only offered in the 3-door body style.

GT 
This trim level is the lowest level of the AE86, which was the base model of the AE86. They were mainly sold as vehicles aimed at competitive use. These models have the interior of the AE85 SR, with blue-tinted glass, rear drum brakes, basic two-spoke steering wheel, steel wheels, smaller center console, and manual mirrors and windows. Options include (but not limited to): air-conditioning, power steering, power mirrors, limited slip differential (LSD), optional alloy wheels, OEM aero sports package (available after Sep 1983), mudflaps, automatic transmission (Kouki models only), and rear defrost. All of these options are available on both the Levin and Trueno, in both 2-door and 3-door body styles.

North American AE86 specifications

There are three types of Corolla Sport RWD for the US market: DX, SR5, and GT-S. Although the DX was generally an internal Toyota designation, as brochures, and advertising do not include the DX designation; it consisted of a lower trim level, lighter duty suspension parts and the like.
 Model Years of production: 1984 to 1987 (production started Sep 1983)
 Versions: DX, SR5 and GT-S (85+ Only)
 

Note that the VIN and the chassis code do not match for all models.

DX & SR5 specifications
 First 7 characters of VIN: JT2AE85 (DX) or JT2AE86 (SR5)
 Chassis code: AE86 (L) (which may differ from the VIN) (L designates LHD)
 Horsepower:  @ 4800 rpm
 Torque:  @ 2800 rpm
 Weight: approximately 
 Engine: 4A-C, 
 Engine type: SOHC 8-valve Inline-4 carbureted
 M/T transmission: T50, 6-bolt flywheel
 A/T transmission: A42DL, 4-speed overdrive w/lockup torque converter, mechanically controlled, with electronically engaged overdrive
 Compression: 9.0:1 (many vary, as there was an early and late model 4AC)
 Differential:  open with 4.10:1 ratio, 2-pinion (automatic) (S292) or 3.91:1 ratio, 4-pinion (5-speed) (S314)
 Wheels/tires: 13×5" +33 mm offset rims with 185/70R13 tires

GT-S specifications
 First 7 characters of VIN: JT2AE88
 Chassis code: AE86 (L) (which differs from the VIN) (L designates LHD)
 Horsepower:  @ 6600 rpm
 Torque:  @ 4800 rpm
 Weight: approximately 
 Engine: 4A-GEC, 
 Engine type: DOHC 16-valve Inline-4 AFM Multiport Fuel Injection w/T-VIS
 Transmission: T50, 8-bolt flywheel
 Injector size: . , low impedance
 Compression: 9.4:1
 Differential:  Open (T282) or optional LSD (T283) with 4.30:1 Ratio, 2-pinion
 Wheels/tires: 14×5.5" +27 mm offset rims with 185/60R14 82H tires (195/60R14 85H for 86+ models)

The AE86 in motorsports

While in production, the AE86 was a popular choice for showroom stock, Group A, and Group N racing, especially in rallying and circuit races. After production ended, many private teams continued to race the AE86, and it remains a popular choice for rallying and club races today.

Part of the continued appeal of the AE86 for motorsports is its rear-drive configuration, not available in most newer lightweight coupes. In Group A touring car races, the car either dominated the lower category where eligible or fought it out with Honda Civics or the later AE92s and AE101s whilst maintaining its competitiveness. In Ireland, where rallying is considered one of the most popular forms of motorsport, as organizing regulations are more relaxed compared to that of other countries, the AE86 was popular when new, and remains so popular that teams will purchase cars from the UK due to local shortages. The AE86 is also popular for rally use in Finland, where the cars can be competitive in the F-Cup competition for naturally aspirated 2WD cars.

The AE86 was entered in the European Touring Car Championship from 1984 to 1988 with a  4A-GEU engine. In 1986 it beat the BMW M6, BMW 325i (E30), Rover Vitesse, Volvo 240 Turbo, Merkur XR4Ti, Mazda 929, Holden Commodore (VK), Alfa Romeo 75 (turbo V6), and Mercedes 190E 2.3-16 to win the Manufacturers Championship with 267 points, surpassing the 1986 Drivers Championship Schnitzer Motorsport BMW M6.

In 1986 and 1987 Chris Hodgetts won the British Touring Car Championship (BTCC), beating the V8 Rover SD1's, Ford Sierra Cosworth's and BMW 3 Series (E30) M3's two years running for an overall points victory driving an AE86 for Toyota (GB) PLC and his own race prep team CHMS.

The semi-factory supported Kraft team entered a spaceframe Trueno in the JGTC for the GT300 regulations in 1999. Despite being popular with the fans, the car had minor success and was abandoned from use halfway through the 2001 season when the AE86 burst into flames during the third round of the season at Sugo. Kraft subsequently replaced it with the newly-delivered Toyota MR-S.

The rear wheel drive configuration, combined with the AE86's light weight (approximately 2300 lb (950–970 kg) curb weight), balance and relatively powerful (and easy to tune) 4A-GEU engine made it popular among the Japanese hashiriya (street racers in Japanese), many of whom raced in touge (mountain passes in Japanese) where the corners suited the AE86 best, especially on the downhill. Among those who utilized this car was Japanese racing legend Keiichi Tsuchiya also known as the Drift King ("Dori-Kin" in Japanese). Keiichi Tsuchiya helped popularize the sport of drifting, which involves taking a car on a set of controlled slides through corners. The AE86's FR configuration made it well suited to this kind of cornering, and currently the car is a mainstay of drift shows and competitions. Japanese drifters like Katsuhiro Ueo, Toshiki Yoshioka, Yoichi Imamura, Koichi Yamashita, Hiroshi Takahashi, Tetsuya Hibino, and Wataru Hayashi were also involved in making the AE86 famous in the drift scene.

AE86s around the world have been extensively modified for use in professional drifting.

In popular culture

The AE86 is considered as an iconic cultural symbol in Japanese popular culture following its inclusion in the Initial D anime and manga. The main character, Takumi Fujiwara, uses his father's AE86 Trueno GT-APEX liftback for racing and making his tofu deliveries. Takumi's friend, Itsuki Takeuchi, drives an AE85 Levin. Throughout the series, two of Takumi's opponents drive AE86s: Wataru Akiyama, who drives a turbocharged (later supercharged) AE86 Corolla Levin, and Shinji Inui, who drives the notchback coupé version of the AE86 Trueno. The AE86 is also a playable vehicle in the Initial D Arcade Stage series. The popularity of Initial D is cited as the main cause of the car's high resale price, which is often referred to as "Takumi tax" or "Tofu tax", after the main character and his tofu delivery occupation respectively.

Production
The Toyota AE86 (as well as the AE85) was built in either the Kanto Higashi-Fuji plant, or the Takaoka plant.

AE86s built at the (now-closed) Kanto Higashi-Fuji plant came with a "5" designation at the beginning of the serial number. Their plant codes were "M21" and "M22". Only 28% of AE86s were produced at this plant, all of them being made for Japan with no export models being made.

AE86s built at the Takaoka plant came with a "0" designation at the beginning of the serial number. Their plant codes were "A54" and "A52". The majority of AE86s were produced at this plant (including exported AE86 models), as it was the original plant where the Toyota Corolla and Sprinter are manufactured.

References

External links 
 

Toyota vehicles
Rear-wheel-drive vehicles
Rally cars
Sport compact cars
Hot hatches
1980s cars
Cars introduced in 1983
Cars discontinued in 1987